Francis Thomas Juster (August 17, 1926 in Hollis, New York–July 21, 2010 in Ann Arbor, Michigan) was an American economist known for researching household savings, wealth and time use. He was the founding director of both the landmark Health and Retirement Study and of its companion study, the Asset and Health Dynamics Among the Oldest Old (AHEAD).

Career
Juster worked at the Central Intelligence Agency as a senior research analyst from 1951 to 1953. He then joined the faculty of Amherst College, where he taught as an assistant professor from 1953 to 1959. From 1959 to 1973, he was a researcher at the National Bureau of Economic Research. He was a professor at the University of Michigan and a research scientist at the Institute for Social Research's Survey Research Center from 1973 to 1996. He directed the Institute for Social Research from 1976 to 1986. In 1996, he retired from the University of Michigan, whereupon the university named him an emeritus professor. From 2001 to 2002, he was acting director of the Michigan Retirement Research Center.

References

1926 births
2010 deaths
American economists
University of Michigan faculty
Amherst College faculty
Rutgers University alumni
Columbia University alumni
Fellows of the American Statistical Association